Yŏnggwang station is a metro station on the Mangyongdae Line of the Pyongyang Metro.

Before the rules were relaxed in 2010, it was one of the only two stations that tourists could visit, the other one being Puhung station, because these two stations are the most finely decorated in the system. They were also the last two to be completed. A third mosaic mural is called Lake Chon on Mt. Paektu.

Connections
The station is located near P'yŏngyang station of the Korean State Railway, with connections to long-distance trains on the P'yŏngnam, P'yŏngra, and P'yŏngŭi Lines.

References

External links
 
 360° interactive panorama inside Yonggwang station

Pyongyang Metro stations
Murals in North Korea
Railway stations opened in 1987
1987 establishments in North Korea